14-3-3 protein epsilon is a protein that in humans is encoded by the YWHAE gene.

Function 

This gene product belongs to the 14-3-3 family of proteins which mediate signal transduction by binding to phosphoserine-containing proteins. This highly conserved protein family is found in both plants and mammals, and this protein is 100% identical to the mouse ortholog. It interacts with CDC25 phosphatases, RAF1 and IRS1 proteins, suggesting its role in diverse biochemical activities related to signal transduction, such as cell division and regulation of insulin sensitivity. It has also been implicated in the pathogenesis of small cell lung cancer, and microdeletions associated with Miller–Dieker syndrome.

Interactions 

YWHAE has been shown to interact with:

 C-Raf, 
 CDC25B, 
 HDAC4, 
 HERG, 
 IRS1 and 
 IGF1R, 
 MAP3K3,
 NDEL1, 
 NGFRAP1,  and
 TGF beta 1.

See also
 14-3-3 protein

References

Further reading

14-3-3 proteins